Bahr el-Ghazal (Arabic بحر الغزال , also transliterated Bahr al-Ghazal, Baḩr al-Ghazāl, Bahr el-Gazel, or versions of these without the hyphen) may refer to two distinct places, both named after ephemeral or dry rivers.

Chad
 Bahr el-Ghazal (wadi in Chad), a dry riverbed in central Chad
 Bahr el Gazel (region of Chad), an administrative region of Chad
 Bahr el Gazel Nord, a department in the region
 Bahr el Gazel Sud, a department in the region
 Bahr el Gazel Department, former name of the region

South Sudan
 Bahr el Ghazal (region of South Sudan), a geographic region of northwestern South Sudan
 Bahr el Ghazal River, a river in South Sudan
 Northern Bahr el Ghazal, a former state in South Sudan
 Western Bahr el Ghazal, a former state in South Sudan

See also
 Bahr (disambiguation)
 Ghazal (disambiguation)